Minuscule 688 (in the Gregory-Aland numbering), ε246 (von Soden), is a Greek minuscule manuscript of the New Testament, on parchment. It is dated by a colophon to the year 1179. The manuscript has complex contents. Scrivener labelled it by 592e.

Description 

The codex contains the text of the four Gospels, on 226 parchment leaves (size ), in 24 quires. The text is written in two columns per page, 24 lines per page.

According to Scrivener the manuscript is written "with peculiar, almost barbarous, illuminations".

Text 

The Greek text of the codex is a representative of the Byzantine text-type. Kurt Aland placed it in Category V.

According to the Claremont Profile Method it represents textual family Kx in Luke 1 and Luke 20. In Luke 10 no profile was made. It creates textual cluster with Codex Athous Dionysiou.

History 

According to the colophon the manuscript was written by monk John αναγνωστης in 1179. It was bought from Spyridion Lambros from Athens in 1859 (along with the codex 689, 690, 691, 692, and 693).

It was added to the list of New Testament manuscript by Scrivener (592) and Gregory (688).

It was examined by Bloomfied, Dean Burgon, and Kirsopp Lake.

The manuscript is currently housed at the British Library (Add MS 22736) in London.

See also 

 List of New Testament minuscules
 Biblical manuscript
 Textual criticism

References

Further reading 

 S. T. Bloomfield, Critical Annotations: Additional and Supplementary on the New Testament (1860)
 Kirsopp Lake & Silva Lake, Dated Greek Minuscule Manuscripts to the Year 1200, Boston II, 82.

Greek New Testament minuscules
12th-century biblical manuscripts
British Library additional manuscripts